The World Wrestling Peace Festival was a professional wrestling supercard event produced by Japanese professional wrestler Antonio Inoki, which took place on June 1, 1996 at the Los Angeles Sports Arena in Los Angeles, California. The event was organized by Inoki to promote world peace with an interpromotional event involving major promotions from around the world. Forty wrestlers from six countries ended up taking part in the event.

Inoki's home promotion New Japan Pro-Wrestling (NJPW), as well as smaller independent groups, represented Japan, while World Championship Wrestling (WCW) and the National Wrestling Alliance (NWA) took part on behalf of the United States. The World Wrestling Federation (WWF) and Extreme Championship Wrestling (ECW) were the only major promotions in North America not to participate in the show although this was not unexpected given their tense relationships with WCW during the Monday Night Wars. Both of Mexico's top promotions Asistencia Asesoría y Administración (AAA) and Consejo Mundial de Lucha Libre (CMLL) participated in the event, which was considered unlikely by many in the industry given their own heated rivalry.

The main attraction on the event card was a tag team match with Antonio Inoki and NWA World Heavyweight Champion Dan Severn wrestling Yoshiaki Fujiwara and Oleg Taktarov. Inoki and Severn won the match when Severn pinned Fujiwara with a keylock. One of the featured bouts on the undercard was a title match between WCW World Heavyweight Champion The Giant and Sting, which The Giant won. Other matches included a "NJPW vs. Michinoku Pro" match between Jyushin Thunder Liger and The Great Sasuke, a triangle match between AAA Americas Heavyweight Champion Konnan, Chris Jericho and Bam Bam Bigelow, and a tag team match pitting Perro Aguayo and La Parka against Pierroth Jr. and Cibernetico.

The event had an attendance of 5,964, far less than the 17,000 promoters were expecting, which was attributed to a poor choice of venue and lack of advertising. Though not as financially successful as Inoki's Collision in Korea show the previous year, he was widely praised for his efforts. This was the first-ever wrestling show that Inoki promoted in the United States. The event, which also helped raise money for wrestling and judo programs in Los Angeles-area high schools, was supported by then Los Angeles Mayor Richard Riordan and Los Angeles County Supervisor Michael D. Antonovich. A few days before the show, Inoki was made honorary chief of police of Little Tokyo. At the show's conclusion, Inoki was also awarded a special "PWI Lifetime Achievement Award" by Pro Wrestling Illustrated senior editor Bill Apter.

In addition, it received positive reviews from publications such as Pro Wrestling Illustrated and the Wrestling Observer Newsletter. This was supported by the internet wrestling community when it was released on DVD, albeit without matches featuring WCW wrestlers, years later. Arnold Furious of the professional wrestling section of 411mania.com rated the event a 7.0 out of 10. In his review, Kevin Wilson of PuroresuCentral.com called Inoki's Peace Festival "probably the biggest show to ever take place in America" featuring international talent and that "the majority of the matches were good and a few were near excellent".

The show is credited, along with AAA's When Worlds Collide show two years earlier, with helping introduce lucha libre to mainstream American wrestling fans. Eric Bischoff, who appeared with representatives from AAA and CMLL to open the show, later brought Rey Misterio Jr. and Chris Jericho into WCW, based on their performance in their respective matches, to compete for its cruiserweight division.

Terry Funk was scheduled to face Sabu and Brian Pillman in a three-way match, but pulled out of the show on May 8 after Pillman was sidelined following an automobile accident and Sabu was removed from the show after being booked for Big Japan Pro Wrestling (BJW) on the same date.

Results

See also
Professional wrestling in Japan
Professional wrestling in Mexico
Professional wrestling in the United States

References

External links

1996 in California
1996 in professional wrestling
Professional wrestling shows
Professional wrestling in Los Angeles
All Japan Women's Pro-Wrestling
Consejo Mundial de Lucha Libre co-promoted shows
Lucha Libre AAA Worldwide shows
National Wrestling Alliance shows
New Japan Pro-Wrestling shows
World Championship Wrestling shows
Professional wrestling joint events